The Lucerna is a Colombian breed of dual-purpose cattle. It is a composite breed, created in the twentieth century by cross-breeding local Criollo cattle of the Hartón breed with imported dairy cattle of European type. This was the earliest composite breed to be developed in South America.

History 

The Lucerna is a composite breed, the earliest such breed to be developed in South America. It was created in the Valle del Cauca from about 1937. Local Criollo cattle of the Hartón del Valle breed were cross-bred with imported European-type dairy cattle of the Friesian and Milking Shorthorn breeds. By 1972 the percentages in the composite had stabilised at approximately 40% Friesian and 30% of each of Hartón and Shorthorn.
From the mid-1950s, breeding was aimed principally at the improvement of dairy qualities.

In 1986 the Lucerna was kept on no more than fifteen farms; by the end of the century this number had tripled, and there were almost  of the cattle. In 2018 the total number was reported as 1028 head. The conservation status of the breed is reported as "not at risk". Some semen is stored, but this is apparently not for conservation but for commercial reasons.

Characteristics 

The Lucerna is of medium size. The coat is normally solid cherry-red, but is somewhat variable.

Use 

References 

Cattle breeds
Cattle breeds originating in Colombia